Licking Township is one of four townships in Blackford County, Indiana. As of the 2010 census, its population was 7,899 and it contained 3,885 housing units.  The township was named after Lick Creek and a salt lick in the area. The first settlers in what became Blackford County arrived in the Lick Creek area in 1831.

Geography
Cains Lake and Lake Mohee are in this township. Lick Creek flows through the township.

Cities and towns
 Hartford City
 Shamrock Lakes

Unincorporated towns
 Hoover Park
 Renner

Major highways

Cemeteries
The township contains at least seven cemeteries: Cunningham, Greenlawn, Independent Order of Odd Fellows, Lion, Sprague, Stewart, and Willman (a.k.a. Hartford City Cemetery).

References

Citations

Sources

 
 United States Census Bureau cartographic boundary files

External links

 Indiana Township Association
 United Township Association of Indiana

Townships in Blackford County, Indiana
Townships in Indiana